Maryborough Correctional Centre is a prison located at Stein Road,  Aldershot, Queensland, Australia, approximately  north-west of Maryborough.

The Maryborough Correctional Centre is a multi-purpose, secure custody facility which accommodates 320 male prisoners in secure accommodation and 180 male prisoners in residential accommodation. It is also a remand and reception centre for offenders from Bundaberg to Gympie.

See also

 List of Australian prisons

References

Prisons in Queensland
Maximum security prisons in Australia
Buildings and structures in Maryborough, Queensland
2003 establishments in Australia